Daniel Nilsson (born 21 September 1982) is a Swedish footballer who plays for Sölvesborgs GoIF as a midfielder.

References

External links

1982 births
Living people
Association football midfielders
Mjällby AIF players
Allsvenskan players
Superettan players
Swedish footballers